NFL Quarterback Club 97 is an American football video game released in 1996. The game was released on the PlayStation, Sega Saturn, and DOS systems. The game was also released in Japan on the Saturn. The game's cover features former Miami Dolphins quarterback Dan Marino.

Gameplay
NFL Quarterback Club 97 optimizes the use of the kicking meter, as well as overhead camera angles, which are customizable. The game also has Custom Simulation modes, which save up to five game situations for players that cannot finish a game in time. Former Green Bay Packers quarterback Brett Favre designed various plays that are available in the game. There are five possible game modes (Preseason, Regular Season, Pro Bowl, Playoff, and Super Bowl). Players can also recreate historic game situations. There is no announcer on the PlayStation version.

Reception

The game received mixed to negative reviews. Reviewing the PlayStation version, the two sports reviewers of Electronic Gaming Monthly both regarded it as a disappointment, though for different reasons: Dindo Perez said the graphics are substandard, while Todd Mowatt said the graphics are vastly improved from the previous Quarterback Club but the AI is too easy to beat by a wide margin. IGN simply commented that the game is slow and the graphics are weak, it is not better than competitor Madden NFL 97, and players should wait for NFL Quarterback Club '98. GamePros Johnny Ballgame also compared it unfavorably to Madden NFL 97. He said that while it is solid in terms of gameplay and features, the graphics, though better on the PlayStation than on any other version, suffer from choppy scrolling and animation which make it difficult to follow the ball carrier. Jeff Kitts of GameSpot said that the players are slow, the weather options are poor, and penalties are unrealistic. CNET criticized the poor sound, graphics, lack of transactions (except for trades), and stated that every team has the same playbook. CNET also stated that game scores can peak into the 100s, and that players cannot get tired nor injured.

Reviews for the Saturn version were similar. Dr. Zombie wrote in GamePro that "NFL Quarterback Club '97 reports to camp with notable graphical and gameplay improvements over its rookie outing." However, similarly to IGN he found the game was outdone by the Saturn version of Madden NFL '97, which was being released at the same time and featured smoother graphics and responsive commentary. A reviewer for Next Generation likewise said the game is a huge improvement over the previous installment but still clearly inferior to Madden NFL '97, and additionally criticized that the Saturn version's colors are less bright than the PlayStation version's. However, he did say that the tackling mechanics are remarkably innovative and expressed hope that they would be imitated by other football games. Rich Leadbetter of Sega Saturn Magazine said the game is well-done in some respects, particularly the selection of plays and the ability to replay or create new situations, but "is out-gunned, out-quaffed and basically out-done in every way by EA's Madden '97" due to the below-average sprite scaling and animation, lack of PAL optimization, and unintuitive controls.

References

1996 video games
PlayStation (console) games
Sega Saturn games
DOS games
NFL Quarterback Club
Acclaim Entertainment games
Video games developed in the United States